South Dakota Highway 240 (SD 240), also signed as the Badlands Loop, is a  state highway in southeastern Pennington and northwestern Jackson counties in South Dakota, United States, that travels through the eastern portion of Badlands National Park.

Route description

SD 240 begins in Wall at exit 110 of Interstate 90 (I-90). It travels south to Badlands National Park, where it turns southeast. At the Badlands Headquarters at Cedar Pass, the highway turns northeast, ending at exit 131 of I-90 near Cactus Flat. Because the highway enters a national park, there is an entrance fee charged along the highway at either entrance to the park. The fee is $30 per passenger vehicle, good for 7 days.

History

Eastern portions of the highway that are currently designated as SD 240 (generally from the park headquarters to Cactus Flat) were originally part of the original alignment of SD 40. Construction began in the early 1930s. By 1944, a gravel surface was on the Badlands Loop alignment, and by the late 1940s, the Badlands Loop was signed as U.S. Route 16 Alternate (US 16 Alt.), in addition to SD 40 along the eastern portion of the loop. These two numbers were used until the early 1970s, when the SD 40 number was replaced by an extension of SD 44 (which entered the park from the southeast rather than the northeast).

Around 1980, US 16, which traveled concurrently with I-90, was truncated at its eastern end to Rapid City. Since US 16 Alt. no longer met the parent route, the route number was changed to SD 240.

Major intersections

See also

 List of state highways in South Dakota

References

External links

 Badlands National Park Homepage (U.S. National Park Service)
 Badlands Loop Scenic Byway
 South Dakota Highways Page, highways 200 through 1806

240
Transportation in Pennington County, South Dakota
Transportation in Jackson County, South Dakota
U.S. Route 16
Badlands National Park